Sak Kaoponlek, also known as Kaoponglek Luksuratham (ขาวผ่องเล็ก ลูกสุรธรรม) in Thailand is a Thai Muay Thai fighter and trainer.

Career
Kaoponlek started training and fighting in Muay Thai when he was 11 years old at home with his father. He then joined the Luksuratum gym in Nakhon Ratchasima and at 13 he debuted on the Bangkok circuit.

On April 11, 2015 he fought in the International Gala "Oktagon" in Milan, Italy.

He retired to train and teach. He is the coach of the European Muay Thai organization Fight1.

Titles and accomplishments
Lumpinee Stadium
 Lumpinee Stadium 130 lbs Champion

Kombat League
 2009 La Grande Sfida Sui 4 Angoli 8-man Tournament Runner-up
2010 Intercontinental Kombat League Championship (67 kg)
WMF
2010 WMF World Championship (-69.9 kg)
MTA Muaythai
2007 M.T.A. World Muaythai Championship (-64 kg)
WAKO
2007 WAKO World Championship (-64.4 kg)
Trieste Muaythai
2001 Trieste Muaythai World Championship (63.5 kg)

Awards
 1995 Sports Writers Association of Thailand Fighter of the Year

Fight record 

|-  style="background:#cfc;"
| 2015-04-11 || Win ||align=left| Dmitry Varats || Oktagon || Assago, Italy || Decision || 3 || 3:00
|-  style="background:#cfc;"
| 2014-05-10 || Win ||align=left| Azize Hlali || La Notte dei Campioni || Italy || TKO || 2 ||
|-  style="background:#c5d2ea;"
| 2014-04-05 || Draw ||align=left| Sergey Kulyaba || Oktagon || Milan, Italy || Decision || 3 || 3:00
|-  style="background:#cfc;"
| 2013-04-20 || Win ||align=left| Sergio Wielzen || Glory 7: Milan || Milan, Italy || Decision (Unanimous) || 3 || 3:00
|-  style="background:#cfc;"
| 2013-03-02 || Win ||align=left| Alessio D'Angelo || Giorgio Petrosyan vs Ole Laursen || Trieste, Italy || KO (Knees)|| 3 || 
|-  style="background:#cfc;"
| 2013-02-14 || Win ||align=left| Mehdi Zatout || Best Of Siam 3 || Paris, France || Decision || 3 || 3:00
|-  style="background:#cfc;"
| 2012-11-24 || Win ||align=left| Crice Boussoukou || Thai Boxe Mania || Torino, Italy || Decision (Unanimous) || 3 || 3:00
|-  style="background:#cfc;"
| 2012-07-28 || Win ||align=left| Elias Aharram || Le Choc des Gladiateurs XI || Le Lavandou, France || Decision || 3 || 3:00
|-  style="background:#cfc;"
| 2011-12-17 || Win ||align=left| Crice Boussoukou || A1 WCC || La Tour-de-Salvagny, France || KO || 2 ||
|-  style="background:#cfc;"
| 2011-11-26 || Win ||align=left| Martin Sily || Iron Fighter || Zoppola, Italy || KO (Right elbow) || 1||
|-  style="background:#cfc;"
| 2011-10-08 || Win ||align=left| Charles François || Muaythai Premier League: Round 2 || Padua, Italy || TKO (cut) || 3 ||
|-  style="background:#cfc;"
| 2011-06-04 || Win ||align=left| Alessio D'Angelo || Thailand Invasion || Tivoli, Italy || TKO || 2 ||
|-  style="background:#cfc;"
| 2011-05-21 || Win ||align=left| Corrado Zanchi || La Notte Dei Campioni || Seregno, Italy || Decision || 3 ||3:00
|-  style="background:#cfc;"
| 2011-05-21 || Win ||align=left| Morgan Adrar || La Notte Dei Campioni || Seregno, Italy || TKO (Doctor Stoppage) || 2 ||
|-  style="background:#cfc;"
| 2011-03-13 || Win ||align=left| David Calvo || Armados y Peligrosos VI || Barcelona, Spain || KO (Right elbow) || 2 ||
|-  style="background:#cfc;"
| 2011-02-11 || Win ||align=left|  Elias Aharram || Les Rois des Rings III || Ludres, France || Decision || 5 || 3:00
|-  style="background:#cfc;"
| 2011-01-29 || Win ||align=left| Andrei Kulebin || Thai Boxe Mania || Turin, Italy || Decision || 5 || 3:00
|-  style="background:#cfc;"
| 2010-12-04 || Win ||align=left| Frédéric Diaz || International Fight Show || Loano Italy || KO (Right hook)|| 1 ||
|-  style="background:#cfc;"
| 2010-12-04 || Win ||align=left| Claudio Amoruso || International Fight Show || Loano Italy || TKO (Referee Stoppage)|| 2 ||
|-  style="background:#cfc;"
| 2010-09-11 || Win ||align=left| Charles François || Iron Fighter || Pordenone, Italy || Decision || 5 || 3:00
|-
! style=background:white colspan=9 |
|-  style="background:#cfc;"
| 2010-07-31 || Win ||align=left| Mauro Serra || Kickboxer's Night 2010 || Portoscuso, Italy || TKO (Knees)|| 4 ||
|-  style="background:#cfc;"
| 2010-05-01 || Win ||align=left| Elia Filippini || Onesongchai Muay Thai || Rimini, Italy || TKO (Right Elbow) || 3 || 
|-
! style=background:white colspan=9 |
|-  style="background:#fbb;"
| 2010-01-30 || Loss ||align=left| Ekapon Ettapong || Thai Boxe Mania || Turin, Italy || KO  || 2 || 
|-
! style=background:white colspan=9 |
|-  style="background:#cfc;"
| 2009-12-06|| Win ||align=left| Marc Hamann ||   International Fight Show || Italy || TKO || ||
|-  style="background:#cfc;"
| 2009-11-20|| Win ||align=left| Sidi Diallo ||  Ring Rules || Italy || KO || ||
|-  style="background:#cfc;"
| 2009-06-20|| Win ||align=left| Michael Dicks ||  Lignano Sabbiadoro || Italy || Decision || 5||3:00
|-  style="background:#fbb;"
| 2009-05-02 || Loss||align=left| Nopparat Keatkhamtorn || La Grande Sfida Sui 4 Angoli, Final || Rimini, Italy || TKO (Exhaustion)|| 2 ||
|-
! style=background:white colspan=9 |
|-  style="background:#cfc;"
| 2009-05-02 || Win ||align=left| Jaad El Byari|| La Grande Sfida Sui 4 Angoli, Semi Final || Rimini, Italy || TKO || ||
|-  style="background:#cfc;"
| 2009-05-02 || Win ||align=left| Abraham Roqueñi || La Grande Sfida Sui 4 Angoli, Quarter Final || Rimini, Italy || Decision || 3||3:00
|-  style="background:#cfc;"
| 2009-03-07|| Win ||align=left|  Saro Presti || Contender Asia : Selezione Italia,  Final || Modena, Italy || Decision || 3||3:00
|-  style="background:#cfc;"
| 2009-03-07|| Win ||align=left| Hicham Betaini || Contender Asia : Selezione Italia, Semi Final || Modena, Italy || KO || 1 ||
|-  style="background:#cfc;"
| 2009-03-07|| Win ||align=left|  Danial Sharifi|| Contender Asia : Selezione Italia, Quarter Final || Modena, Italy || KO || 1 ||
|-  style="background:#fbb;"
| 2009-01-31|| Loss||align=left| Imwiset Pornarai|| Campionato Mondiale Thai Boxe & K-1 Rules || Turin, Italy || Decision || 5 || 3:00 
|-
! style=background:white colspan=9 |
|-  style="background:#cfc;"
| 2008-12-06 || Win ||align=left| Anis Kaabouri ||  Memorial Mimmo Polizzano || Loano, Italy || KO (Low kick)|| 2||
|-  style="background:#fbb;"
| 2008-05-10 || Loss||align=left|  Marvin Sansaar|| Italian Extreme VI || Modena, Italy || TKO (Leg injury)|| 2 ||
|-  style="background:#cfc;"
| 2007-11-24 || Win ||align=left| Jimmy Eimers || Janus Fight Night || Padova, Italy || Decision || 5 || 3:00
|-  style="background:#cfc;"
| 2007-07-27 || Win ||align=left| Kieran Keddle ||  Alessandro Gotti Promotion || Abano Terme, Italy || Decision || 5 || 3:00
|-  style="background:#cfc;"
| 2007-06-09 || Win ||align=left| Mickaël Piscitello || La Nuit des Challenges 4 || Lyon, Saint-Fons, France || TKO (Referee Stoppage) || 2 ||
|-  style="background:#cfc;"
| 2007-05-26 || Win ||align=left| Sasa Jovanovic || Thai Boxe Abano Gran Prix || Abano Terme, Italy || Decision || 5 || 3:00
|-  style="background:#cfc;"
| 2007-05-12 || Win ||align=left| Redouan Edady || Kickboxing Superstar || Milan, Italy || Decision || 5 || 3:00
|-
! style="background:white" colspan=8 | 
|-  style="background:#cfc;"
| 2007-04-06 || Win ||align=left| Fabio Pinca || Muay Thai: Kaoponlek VS Liam HARRISON || Italy || Decision || 5 || 3:00
|-
! style="background:white" colspan=8 | 
|-  style="background:#fbb;"
| 2006-11-04 || Loss ||align=left| Wilfried Montagne || 20 Ans Du Lumpini || Saint-Denis, France || Decision || 5 || 3:00
|-  style="background:#fbb;"
| 2006-06-03 || Loss ||align=left| Abdallah Mabel || La Nuit des Challenges 3 || Lyon, Saint-Fons, France || KO || 3 ||
|-  style="background:#cfc;"
| 2006-06-02 || Win ||align=left| Rodolf Durica || The King Of Kings II || Milan, Italy || TKO (Doctor Stoppage)||  ||
|-  style="background:#fbb;"
| 2005-11-19 || Loss ||align=left| Jerry Morris|| Janus Fight Night || Padova, Italy || TKO (Injury)|| 2 ||
|-  style="background:#cfc;"
| 2005-11-19 || Win ||align=left|  Petro Nakonechny	 || Janus Fight Night || Padova, Italy || Decision || 4 || 3:00
|-  style="background:#cfc;"
| 2005-11-05 || Win ||align=left|  Phil Mcalpine ||  || Trieste, Italy || TKO  || 2 ||
|-  style="background:#cfc;"
| 2005-10-22 || Win ||align=left| Farid Khider ||  La Nuit des Superfights II|| Villebon, France || Decision  || 5 || 3:00
|-  style="background:#cfc;"
| 2005-06-10 || Win ||align=left| Frankie Hadders ||  Gala Mondiale	 || Fiume Veneto, Italy || TKO  || 4 ||
|-  style="background:#cfc;"
| 2004-11-27 || Win ||align=left| Satoshi Kobayashi ||  || Italy || TKO (Doctor Stoppage) || 2 ||
|-  style="background:#cfc;"
| 2004-11-06 || Win ||align=left|  Johny Tancray || Trieste - Francia vs Italia|| Trieste, Italy || Decision  || 5 ||3:00
|-
! style="background:white" colspan=8 | 
|-  style="background:#cfc;"
| 2004-07-17 || Win ||align=left| Ali Kanfouah || Trieste - Francia vs Italia|| Trieste, Italy || KO  || 2 ||
|-  style="background:#cfc;"
| 2004-05-08 || Win ||align=left|  Diego Calzolari || Trieste || Trieste, Italy || KO  || 3 ||
|-  style="background:#fbb;"
| 2003-04-18 || Loss ||align=left| Jean-Charles Skarbowsky || Grand tournoi des Moyens || Paris, France || KO  ||  ||
|-  style="background:#fbb;"
| 2003-03-03 || Loss ||align=left| Jean-Charles Skarbowsky || Rajadamnern Stadium || Bangkok, Thailand || KO (Right uppercut) || 3 || 

|-  style="background:#cfc;"
| 2002-07-07 || Win ||align=left| Jean-Charles Skarbowsky || ISKA Kickboxing, Palais Omnisport Bercy || Paris, France || KO (Right highkick) || 4 ||
|-  style="background:#cfc;"
| 2002-06-08 || Win ||align=left| Dado Imirici || Les Titans du III ème Millénaire || Trieste, Italy || KO  || 2 ||
|-  style="background:#cfc;"
| 2001-11-22 || Win ||align=left| Jean-Charles Skarbowsky || Trieste || Trieste, Italy || KO (Elbow) || 4 || 
|-
! style=background:white colspan=9 |
|- style="background:#fbb;"
| 2000-04-25 || Loss||align=left| Twaeesap Sitsaengarun || Lumpinee Stadium || Bangkok, Thailand || Decision  ||5 ||3:00
|- style="background:#cfc;"
| 2000-03-17 || Win ||align=left| Chokdee Por.Pramuk|| Lumpinee Stadium || Bangkok, Thailand || Decision  ||5 ||3:00
|- style="background:#fbb;"
| 2000-01-29 || Loss||align=left| Khunsuk Sitpromert || Lumpinee Stadium || Bangkok, Thailand || Decision  ||5 ||3:00

|-  style="background:#cfc;"
| 1999-09-11|| Win ||align=left| Buatong Sitphutthapim || Lumpinee Stadium  || Bangkok, Thailand || KO || 3||
|-  style="background:#fbb;"
| 1998-10-31 || Loss||align=left| Sangtiennoi Sor.Rungroj || Lumpinee Stadium || Bangkok, Thailand || Decision  || 5 || 3:00

|- style="background:#fbb;"
| 1998-02-27 || Loss ||align=left| Lamnamoon Sor.Sumalee || Lumpinee Stadium || Bangkok, Thailand || TKO  ||  ||
|-  style="background:#cfc;"
| 1997-|| Win ||align=left| Orono Por Muang Ubon || Lumpinee Stadium  || Bangkok, Thailand || TKO (Doctor Stoppage)|| 4 ||
|-  style="background:#cfc;"
| 1997-|| Win ||align=left| Jompoplek Sor Sumalee ||  || Chachoengsao, Thailand || Decision || 5 || 3:00
|- style="background:#cfc;"
| 1997-01-18 || Win||align=left| Keng Singnakhonkui|| Lumpinee Stadium || Bangkok, Thailand || Decision || 5 || 3:00
|- style="background:#cfc;"
| 1996-12-17 || Win ||align=left| Rattanachai Wor.Walapon || Lumpinee Stadium || Bangkok, Thailand || Decision  ||5 ||3:00
|- style="background:#fbb;"
| 1996- || Loss ||align=left| Keng Singnakhonkui|| Lumpinee Stadium || Bangkok, Thailand || TKO || 4||
|- style="background:#cfc;"
| 1996-10-12 || Win ||align=left| Prabseuklek Sitnarong || Lumpinee Stadium || Bangkok, Thailand || Decision  ||5 ||3:00
|- style="background:#fbb;"
| 1996-08-23 || Loss ||align=left| Samkor Chor.Rathchatasupak || Lumpinee Stadium || Bangkok, Thailand || Decision || 5||3:00

|- style="background:#;"
| 1996-07-09 || ||align=left| Mathee Jadeepitak || Lumpinee Stadium || Bangkok, Thailand ||   ||  ||

|- style="background:#cfc;"
| 1996-05-21 ||Win ||align=left| Therdkiat Sitthepitak || Lumpinee Stadium || Bangkok, Thailand || KO (Elbow) || 4 ||

|- style="background:#cfc;"
| 1996-03-18 || Win  ||align=left| Lamnamoon Sor.Sumalee || Lumpinee Stadium || Bangkok, Thailand || TKO (Elbow)  || 4 ||

|- style="background:#cfc;"
| 1996-02-27 || Win  ||align=left| Den Muangsurin || Lumpinee Stadium || Bangkok, Thailand || Decision  || 5 || 3:00

|- style="background:#cfc;"
| ? || Win  ||align=left| Namkabuan Nongkeepahuyuth || Lumpinee Stadium || Bangkok, Thailand ||   ||  ||

|- style="background:#cfc;"
| ? || Win  ||align=left| Chatchai Paiseetong || Lumpinee Stadium || Bangkok, Thailand || Decision || 5 || 3:00

|- style="background:#cfc;"
| 1995-09-05 || Win ||align=left| Hansuk Prasathinpanomrung || Lumpinee Stadium || Bangkok, Thailand || KO ||4 ||

|- style="background:#cfc;"
| 1995-08-04 || Win ||align=left| Theerapong Sitarayut  || Lumpinee Stadium || Bangkok, Thailand || Decision||5 ||3:00
|- style="background:#cfc;"
| 1995-06-27 || Win ||align=left| Wangchannoi Sor Palangchai || Lumpinee Stadium || Bangkok, Thailand  || Decision|| 5 || 3:00
|- style="background:#cfc;"
| 1995-04-25 || Win ||align=left| Tanooin Chor Racha  || Lumpinee Stadium || Bangkok, Thailand || Decision||5 ||3:00
|- style="background:#fbb;"
| 1995-02-27 || Loss||align=left| Thanongsak Sor.Prantalay  || Rajadamnern Stadium || Bangkok, Thailand || Decision||5 ||3:00
|- style="background:#fbb;"
| 1995-01-17 || Loss ||align=left| Keng Singnakhonkui  || Lumpinee Stadium || Bangkok, Thailand || KO ||1 ||
|- style="background:#cfc;"
| 1995-01-07 || Win ||align=left| Pichitsak Saksaengmanee|| Lumpinee Stadium || Bangkok, Thailand || Decision ||5 || 3:00

|- style="background:#cfc;"
| 1994-09-09 || Win ||align=left| Putphatlek Sor Chalermchai || Lumpinee Stadium || Bangkok, Thailand || TKO (Referee Stoppage)||4 ||
|- style="background:#cfc;"
| 1994-08-16 || Win ||align=left| Boontawarn Sithuakaew|| Lumpinee Stadium || Bangkok, Thailand || Decision ||5 || 3:00
|- style="background:#fbb;"
| 1994- || Loss ||align=left| Meechok Sor.Ploenchit || Lumpinee Stadium || Bangkok, Thailand || Decision || 5||3:00
|- style="background:#fbb;"
| 1994-04-29 || Loss ||align=left| Saengmorakot Sor.Ploenchit || Lumpinee Stadium || Bangkok, Thailand || Decision || 5||3:00
|- style="background:#fbb;"
| 1994-03-25 ||Loss ||align=left| Yokthai Sithoar || Lumpinee Stadium || Bangkok, Thailand || KO (Punches)  ||2  ||
|- style="background:#cfc;"
| 1994-02-15 || Win ||align=left| Kruekchai Kaewsamrit || Lumpinee Stadium || Bangkok, Thailand || Decision  ||5 ||3:00
|- style="background:#fbb;"
| 1993-12-17 ||Loss ||align=left| Rattanachai Wor.Walapon || Lumpinee Stadium || Bangkok, Thailand || Decision  ||5  ||3:00
|-
| colspan=9 | Legend:

References

Living people
Sak Kaoponlek
Muay Thai trainers
1977 births
Sak Kaoponlek